The RVM Humanitarian Hospital is a charitable hospital Bengaluru, India  that provides free medical treatment and quality healthcare facilities to the poor.  It is run by the RVM Foundation

The foundation also runs the RVM Transit Home  in Chikkagubbi Village, which serves as a homeless shelter and a refuge to people abandoned by their families.. The home provides free food and shelter to the residents.. Hundreds of homeless patients, after the completion of their treatment at the RVM Hospital, are transferred to the transit home for rehabilitation purposes .

Hospitals in Bangalore
Year of establishment missing